John Jacob Loeb (1910 – 2 March 1970) was an American composer. He wrote music and lyrics for many popular songs, such as "Rosie the Riveter" (1942), "Seems Like Old Times" (1945), "Masquerade", "Reflections in the Water", "Sweetie Pie", "Boo Hoo", "A Sailboat in the Moonlight" and "The Maharajah of Magador".

Born in Chicago, Loeb started composing songs in 1928 while attending Lawrence Woodmere Academy.After he left school, Loeb worked briefly for his father at Eliel, Loeb and Company, the family insurance brokerage firm. He later became a member of American Society of Composers, Authors and Publishers in 1932. Loeb collaborated with Carmen Lombardo, Paul Francis Webster and Edward Lane. He died on 2 March 1970 at Franklin General Hospital in Valley Stream, New York.

John Jacob Loeb was also the cousin of Richard Loeb, one half of the "thrill killing duo", Leopold and Loeb.

References

1910 births
1970 deaths
American male composers
American composers
Lawrence Woodmere Academy alumni
20th-century American male musicians